Alpine fleabane is a common name for several plants and may refer to:

Erigeron alpiniformis, native to northern Canada and Greenland
Erigeron alpinus, native to Europe
Erigeron borealis, native to Greenland, Labrador, and Nunavut